Rachel Steer (born January 25, 1978) is an American biathlete. She competed at the 2002 Winter Olympics and the 2006 Winter Olympics without winning a medal.

References

External links
 

1978 births
Living people
Biathletes at the 2002 Winter Olympics
Biathletes at the 2006 Winter Olympics
American female biathletes
Olympic biathletes of the United States
Sportspeople from Anchorage, Alaska
Universiade silver medalists for the United States
Universiade medalists in biathlon
Competitors at the 1997 Winter Universiade
21st-century American women